A number of vessels have been named Alpha Express, including –

, a ferry in service 1976–80
, a chemical tanker in service 2000–09

Ship names